Foxtrot is a 1976 British-Mexican drama film directed by Arturo Ripstein and starring Peter O'Toole, Charlotte Rampling and Max von Sydow. It was re-released in 1977 as The Far Side of Paradise.

Somewhat in the style of Swept Away (released six months before shooting began on Foxtrot), it's the story of a very chic, Romanian count and countess that escape Europe by yacht in 1939 during World War II for a private island paradise somewhere in the Pacific.

It's rather unsettling and a bit surreal (not surprising, considering director Arturo Ripstein worked with Luis Buñuel), portraying a couple reminiscent of the duke and duchess of Windsor as they undergo a languid descent from elegance to decadence to butchery.

Most striking is the set and wardrobe. The set is a full Art Deco interior under a tent on a deserted island, and the clothes (overseen by Jorge Ramirez) feature a seemingly endless supply of pristine white couture and custom tailoring.

The timing was such that Rampling (then 30) was making this just as Luchino Visconti needed to begin shooting "The Innocent" written with Rampling in mind, and so she couldn't appear in what was Visconti's last film.
Silvia Manriquez

References

External links

1976 films
1976 drama films
English-language Mexican films
Films directed by Arturo Ripstein
Films set in 1939
Films set in 1940
Films set on uninhabited islands
British drama films
Mexican drama films
1970s English-language films
1970s British films
1970s Mexican films